Stanislav Petkov (born ) is a male Bulgarian volleyball player. He is part of the Bulgaria men's national volleyball team. On the club level he plays for Tomis.

References

External links
 Profile at FIVB.org

1987 births
Bulgarian men's volleyball players
Living people
Place of birth missing (living people)